Jeff(rey) Richards may refer to:

 Jeff Richards (actor, born 1924), baseball player and actor
 Jeff Richards (actor, born 1974), cast member of Saturday Night Live and MADtv
 Jeff Richards (American football) (born 1991), American football cornerback
 Jeffrey Richards (born 1945), professor of cultural history
 Jeffrey Richards (producer) (born 1950) American theatrical producer.
 Jeff Richards (Neighbours), fictional character on the Australian soap opera Neighbours

See also
Geoff Richards (disambiguation)